Pothupara  is a Place in Idukki district in the Indian state of Kerala situated in the Western Ghats.
Pothupara is 9 km from Rajakkad, 4 km from Kunchithanny, 17 km from Munnar and 2 km from Ellakkal

Pothupara Is Situated in Kunchithanny Village . St.alphonsa church is The main Religious Center in this Place.

References

Central team reviews Pothupara project

Villages in Idukki district